Émilie Chalas (born 18 October 1977) is a French politician of La République En Marche! (LREM) who was elected to the French National Assembly on 18 June 2017, representing the department of Isère.

Political career
In parliament, Chalas serves on the Committee on Legal Affairs. In addition to her committee assignments, she is a member of the French-Sri Lankan Parliamentary Friendship Group.

Political positions
In October 2017, Chalas was one of 54 LREM members who called for a swift ban on the marketing and use of glyphosate.

In July 2019, Chalas voted in favor of the French ratification of the European Union’s Comprehensive Economic and Trade Agreement (CETA) with Canada.

Controversy
In November 2021, news media reported that Chalas had received anonymous death threats.

References

1977 births
Living people
People from Échirolles
Deputies of the 15th National Assembly of the French Fifth Republic
Women members of the National Assembly (France)
La République En Marche! politicians
21st-century French women politicians